Edson E. Isaacks (born 10 July 1973) is a Namibian educator, farmer and politician serving as a Member of the National Assembly of Namibia since March 2020. He is the operative secretary of the Landless People's Movement.

Biography
Isaacks was born on 10 July 1973 in Windhoek, South West Africa. He studied at the University of Namibia where he obtained a bachelor's degree in education. He then worked as a teacher and a farmer.

Isaacks joined the Landless People's Movement and was appointed the party's operative secretary, a post similar to any given political party's secretary-general position. He was one of the party's parliamentary candidates for the 2019 general election. He was elected as the party won four seats in parliament. Isaacks took office as a Member of the National Assembly on 20 March 2020.

References

External links

Living people
1973 births
Politicians from Windhoek
University of Namibia alumni
Landless People's Movement (Namibia) politicians